Edward St John (8 December 1805 – 17 January 1892) was an English cricketer who was associated with Cambridge University Cricket Club and made his first-class debut in 1829.

He was a student at Downing College, Cambridge. After graduating with a LLB degree in 1831 he became a Church of England priest and was rector of Finchampstead from 1841 until his death in 1892.

References

1805 births
1892 deaths
English cricketers
English cricketers of 1826 to 1863
Cambridge University cricketers
Alumni of Downing College, Cambridge
19th-century English Anglican priests